Machap was a state constituency in Malacca, Malaysia, that has been represented in the Melaka State Legislative Assembly.

The state constituency was first contested in 1974 and is mandated to return a single Assemblyman to the Melaka State Legislative Assembly under the first-past-the-post voting system.

History

Election results 
The electoral results for the Machap Jaya state constituency in 2008 are 2013 are as follows.

References 

Defunct Malacca state constituencies
Constituencies disestablished in 2013
Constituencies established in 1974